Di Lido Island is a neighborhood in the city of Miami Beach on a man-made island in Biscayne Bay, Florida, United States.  It is the third island from the east of the Venetian Islands, a chain of artificial islands in Biscayne Bay in the cities of Miami and Miami Beach.  It is between San Marino Island and Rivo Alto Island.  It is home to residential neighborhoods and a portion of the Venetian Causeway.  The unfinished artificial island Isola di Lolando from the Florida land boom of the 1920s is located near the north tip of Di Lido Island.

Notable residents
Arne Quinze
Barbara Becker
Paulina Rubio 
Susana Gimenez

References

Islands of Miami Beach, Florida
Neighborhoods in Miami Beach, Florida
Artificial islands of Florida
Islands of Florida